Snap is a card game in which players deal cards and react quickly to spot pairs of cards of the same rank. Cards are either dealt into separate piles around the table, one per player, or (particularly when played with young children) into a single shared pile. The game may be a simplified version of the older Snip Snap Snorem.

The game
The pack of cards is dealt out among the players in face-down stacks as equally as possible.  Play proceeds with the players taking it in turns to remove a card from the top of their stack and place it face-up on a pile alongside it.  If two cards on the tops of any of these piles are ever identical (or, if a conventional pack of cards is used, are of the same number), the first player to shout "Snap!" takes both face-up piles and adds them to the bottom of their own stack. The player who accumulates all the cards wins.

A "snap pool" is created from matching stacks if two players shout "Snap!" at the exact same time, or from a player's own stack if they shout "Snap!" in error. Players can shout "Snap pool!" instead of "Snap!" if the matching cards also match the pool, and may take the pool for doing so. (If multiple players call "snap pool", the newly matching cards are also added to the pool.)

Variations
Cards can be played onto a single shared stack, and players call "snap!" if two consecutive cards on this pile are identical. This makes the game easier for younger children. In this version, players may race to call "snap" while slapping the central pile, making the game similar to Slapjack.

A variation called "Menagerie" assigns each player an animal, and requires players to shout the name of animal corresponding to the player who laid a matching card in order to win the pile.

The game is often one of the first card games to be taught to children and is often played with special packs of cards featuring popular children's characters from television programmes or recent films.

In popular culture
In J. K. Rowling's Harry Potter novels, including Harry Potter and the Goblet of Fire, Harry and his friends sometimes play a game called "Exploding Snap", in which some of the cards will explode at random during the game.

In the Goon Show, Eccles will yell "snap", sometimes during a poker game or while on the telephone.

In "Snap", a child book by Roger Hargreaves (creator of the Mr. Men), Snap the crocodile and Woof the dog play Snap.

In Peppa pig Season 2, Episode 43 The Quarrel Peppa and Susie play snap starting the episodes plot

In other cultures 
In Germany and Austria, the game is known as Schnipp-Schnapp or Spitz, pass auf!

See also
 One Card (card game)

References

Literature 
 

English card games
War group
Card games for children

ga:Snap